Gebeleizis (or Gebeleixis, Nebeleizis) was a god worshiped by the Getae, probably related to the Thracian god of storm and lightning, Zibelthiurdos. He was represented as a handsome man, sometimes wearing a beard. The lightning and thunder were his manifestations. According to Herodotus, some Getae equated Gebeleizis with Zalmoxis as the same god.

He is also known as the Dacian knight Derzelas or Derzis.

He has been depicted on a throne or riding a horse, holding a bow in his left hand, joined by a snake going downwards towards the horse's head and an eagle holding a fish in his beak and a rabbit in his claws.

Other times he is depicted as a warrior, riding a horse, followed by a dog holding a lance, throwing it towards a wild boar, or as a peaceful horse rider holding a torch and a cornucopia.

He is also seen to have three heads, as a benevolent god.

Notes

External links

Dacian gods
Thracian gods
Thunder gods